Rattlesnake Creek is a tributary of Spring Brook in Lackawanna County, Pennsylvania, in the United States. The creek has one named tributary, which is known as Six Springs Creek. Rattlesnake Creek is inhabited by wild trout and part of it is considered to be Class A Wild Trout Waters. A dammed lake known as Maple Lake is located near its headwaters. The surficial geology in the area mainly consists of Wisconsinan Till and bedrock, with some alluvium, Wisconsinan Ice-Contact Stratified Drift, wetlands, and peat bogs.

Course
Rattlesnake Creek begins near Tooley Corners in Spring Brook Township. It flows south for a few tenths of a mile and enters Maple Lake. On the southern side of the lake, it flows south for several tenths of a mile, crossing Pennsylvania Route 690 and receiving the tributary Six Springs Creek from the left. The creek then turns west for more than a mile before turning northwest and then north-northwest. After a few miles, it turns southwest and reaches its confluence with Spring Brook in the Nesbitt Reservoir.

Tributaries
Rattlesnake Creek has one named tributary, which is known as Six Springs Creek.

Hydrology
The concentration of alkalinity in Rattlesnake Creek is 17 milligrams per liter.

Geography and geology

The surficial geology along Rattlesnake Creek near its mouth mainly consists of alluvium. However, some patches of Wisconsinan Ice-Contact Stratified Drift and alluvial fan are present, as are larger areas of a glacial or resedimented till known as Wisconsinan Till and bedrock consisting of conglomerate, sandstone, and shale. Further upstream, the surficial geology immediately adjacent to the creek consists of alluvium, but it eventually switches to Wisconsinan Till, which also makes up most of the surficial geology elsewhere in the watershed. However, there are a few large patches of bedrock and a few small patches of Wisconsinan Ice-Contact Stratified Drift. Additionally, there are several patches of wetlands and peat bogs, especially near the headwaters.

Watershed
The mouth of the creek is in the United States Geological Survey quadrangle of Avoca. However, its source is in the quadrangle of Moscow.

A lake known as Maple Lake is on the upper reaches of Rattlesnake Creek. The lake is dammed by the Maple Lake Dam, a homogeneous earthfill embankment.

Below the second Pennsylvania Route 690 crossing, Rattlesnake Creek is entirely on private land and is closed to access.

History
Rattlesnake Creek was entered into the Geographic Names Information System on August 2, 1979. Its identifier in the Geographic Names Information System is 1184670.

There were historically lumber woods in the vicinity of Rattlesnake Creek. A concrete tee beam bridge carrying Pennsylvania Route 690 was constructed across Rattlesnake Creek in 1957.

Biology
Wild trout naturally reproduce in Rattlesnake Creek from its headwaters downstream to its mouth. The creek has supported trout populations as early as the 1970s.

See also
Green Run (Spring Brook), next tributary of Spring Brook going downstream
Plank Bridge Creek, next tributary of Spring Brook going upstream
List of tributaries of the Lackawanna River

References

Rivers of Lackawanna County, Pennsylvania
Tributaries of Spring Brook (Lackawanna River)
Rivers of Pennsylvania